The Breeze is the official student newspaper of James Madison University in Harrisonburg, Virginia. The Breeze publishes 5,000 copies every Thursday. The Breeze publishes local news, a culture section, sports and an opinion section during the academic year. The Breeze is also known to many JMU alumni and current students for having the long-standing tradition of publishing Darts & Pats.

The Breeze has been nominated and won numerous awards during its existence including a 2012 Online Pacemaker Award, a 2012 VPA award for Best in Show for a Non-Daily News Presentation, and a 2012 VPA sweepstakes award. In 2014, The Breeze won a Pacemaker award for excellence in the category of non-daily newspaper at a four-year university. The Pacemaker is an honor in collegiate journalism, and is awarded by the Associated Collegiate Press and the Newspaper Association of America Foundation. It is sometimes referred to as the Pulitzer of student journalism. The Breeze was also named the best mid-sized non-daily newspaper in the state of Virginia by the Virginia Press Association for the second year in a row.

History

The Breeze started as a four-column, four-page weekly publication on December 22, 1922 with few illustrations and fewer photos. Today it is a 20-plus page broadsheet newspaper published weekly with full-color photos and graphics. The paper was originally distributed to women on the way out of the dining hall, but currently is distributed to more than 90 locations on and off-campus.

Origins of the name 

In 1922, the newly established newspaper for the State Normal School for Women held a contest for suggestions on what to name the new publication.  English teacher Elizabeth P. Cleveland suggested the name “The Breeze” saying that, “nothing here strikes a stranger quite so strongly as our mountain breeze. It is both inspiring and stimulating. It is full of pep, but clean. It clears the cobwebs from the brain and sweeps morbidness from the heart.”  

“The Breeze” won the contest, barely beating out “The Campus Cat” by a coin toss. Cleveland was awarded $2 for her entry.

Best of the Burg
Every year in the spring The Breeze prints a special section of the newspaper titled "Best of the Burg." Readers are encouraged to vote online for the "Best of the Burg," which includes their favorite picks for several businesses in the Harrisonburg area.

See also
List of student newspapers in the United States of America

References

External links 
 
 JMU Scholarly Commons Contains almost every issue of the Breeze from 1922 until the present.

Student newspapers published in Virginia
Publications established in 1922
1922 establishments in Virginia
James Madison University